Ostrowo Szlacheckie Palace is a historic palace in Ostrowo Szlacheckie (Września County, Poland). Since 1977 national heritage site (Polish: zabytek).

History 
The palace was built in 1910. Palace park was included in the register in the nineteenth/twentieth century. The first owner was Friedrich Voge. After the death of the heir were Fridrich Voge Paul Voge, wife and children Elsa Ginter, Hilda, Margot. After World War II, the property was nationalized. Currently applying for palace granddaughter of Friedrich Voge.

Gallery

References

Sources 
 

Gmina Września
Ostrowo Szlacheckie
Objects of cultural heritage in Poland